Let's Take the Long Way Home: a memoir of friendship is a memoir by Gail Caldwell (1951–). The memoir describes the friendship between the author and fellow writer Caroline Knapp who died at the age of 42 in 2002, and it takes place in Cambridge, Massachusetts. Let's Take the Long Way Home was published in 2010. The title refers to their habit of taking the long way home so that they could continue their conversations.

Plot summary
The book opens "It's an old, old story: I had a friend and we shared everything, and then she died and so we shared that too.”  The connection between these women was charged from the beginning.  They were introduced by a dog walker who recognized their many similarities and they began "walking their puppies" together in the woods. "Apart, we had each been frightened drunks and single women and dog lovers; together, we became a small corporation. Finding Caroline was like placing a personal ad for an imaginary friend, then having her show up at your door funnier and better than you could have conceived."    The growth of their friendship, the strength of their bond, the tragedy of Caroline's short fight against lung cancer and the grief beyond are all detailed.

Awards and recognition
Let's Take the Long Way Home: a memoir of friendship won the New England Book Award in 2010. It was named one of the top ten non-fiction books of 2010 by Time magazine,  The Washington Post, O: The Oprah Magazine, and many others. Time magazine states that it is "[h]eartbreaking but never maudlin" and "a testament to the power and beauty of mature friendship."  Gail Caldwell won the Pulitzer Prize for Criticism in 2001 for her writing at the Boston Globe.

References

Reviews
 'Soul Deep' by Julie Myerson The New York Times Sunday Book Review August 20, 2010
Gail Caldwell memoir, 'Let's Take the Long Way Home,' reviewed by Heller McAlpin in The Washington Post.
"Let's Take the Long Way Home" by Laura Miller, Salon.com August 1, 2010

External links
''  'Pack of Two' by Caroline Knapp  From the August 2010 issue of O, The Oprah Magazine 
 Publishers Weekly Interview with Gail Caldwell
Random House Reader's Guide and other resources

American memoirs
2010 non-fiction books